Catasetum integerrimum, the intact catasetum, is a species of orchid found from Mexico to Central America.

References

integerrimum
Orchids of Central America
Orchids of Belize
Orchids of Mexico